Fernando Biscaccianti (16 December 1890 – 1963) was an Italian architect. His work was part of the architecture event in the art competition at the 1928 Summer Olympics.

References

1890 births
1963 deaths
20th-century Italian architects
Olympic competitors in art competitions